The 105×617mm (4.1 inch) also known as 105×617mmR is a common, NATO-standard, tank gun cartridge used in 105mm guns such as those derived from the Royal Ordnance L7.

The 105×617mmR cartridge was originally developed from the  calibre Ordnance QF 20-pounder 84 × 618R cartridge as part of the development of the L7 105 mm rifled gun.

Ammunition

Armour-piercing discarding sabot (APDS)

Armour-piercing fin-stabilized discarding sabot (APFSDS) 
There are different ways to measure penetration value. NATO uses the 50% (This means that 50% of the shell had to go through the plate), while the Soviet/Russian standard is higher (80% had to go through). According to authorities like Paul Lakowski, the difference in performance can reach as much as 8%

High explosive anti-tank (HEAT)

High-explosive squash head (HESH)

High explosive (HE)

Smoke shells

Anti-personnel

Illuminating

Gun launched anti-tank guided missile (GLATGM)

105 mm guns using 105x617mm ammunition 
 L7-series (United Kingdom)
 M68-series (USA)
 EX 35 (USA)
 CN 105 F1 (France)
 CN 105 G2 (France)
 10,5 cm Pz Kan 61 (Switzerland)
 L74 (Sweden)
 Rh 105-series (Germany)
 OTO 105 Low Recoil Force Gun (Italy)
 Cockerill 105HP (Belgium)
 GT 3 (South Africa)
 GT 7 (South Africa)
 GT 8 (South Africa)
 FRT L51 (Argentina)
 Type 94 (China)
 Type 15 (China)
 IWS (United Kingdom)

Notes

References 

 Direct Fire Ammunition Handbook 2019, Project Manager Maneuver Ammunition Systems

Artillery
Ammunition
NATO cartridges
Large-caliber cartridges